David Obernosterer (born 30 May 1989) is a male badminton player from Austria. He competed at the 2016 Summer Olympics in Rio de Janeiro, Brazil.

Achievements

BWF International Challenge/Series
Men's Singles

Mixed Doubles

 BWF International Challenge tournament
 BWF International Series tournament
 BWF Future Series tournament

References

External links
 David Obernosterer Homepage
 David Obernosterer Matches

1989 births
Living people
Austrian male badminton players
Olympic badminton players of Austria
Badminton players at the 2016 Summer Olympics
21st-century Austrian people